Tetraodon duboisi is a species of pufferfish endemic to the Democratic Republic of the Congo where it is known only from Stanley Pool. Some sources speculate that they are critically endangered in the wild, but that theory is difficult to verify as violence in the Democratic Republic of the Congo makes it extremely difficult to capture them for the aquarium trade and scientific research. However, there are a few Tetraodon Duboisi specimens owned by private aquarists in the United States. In terms of caring for the Tetraodon Duboisi in aquaria, this species does best in a pH of 7.0-7.5, and a GH of 10-20 grows. It grows to a length of 4 inches TL and is extremely aggressive. Best kept alone in an aquarium of 30 gallons or more.

References
 

Tetraodontidae
Fish described in 1959
Taxa named by Max Poll
Endemic fauna of the Democratic Republic of the Congo